Hurleyville is a community in south Taranaki, in the western North Island of New Zealand. It is located 18 kilometres north of Patea and 30 km southeast of Hāwera.

Pātea Dam is 20.6 km north.

Education
Hurleyville School is a coeducational contributing primary (years 1–6) school with a decile rating of 5 and a roll of 8. The school opened on 15 August 1892.

Notes

Further reading

General historical works

Schools

South Taranaki District
Populated places in Taranaki